The Aquila Italiana founded as the "Società Anonima Aquila" and quickly renamed as "Società Anonima Italiana Aquila" was an Italian automobile manufacturer from 1906 to 1917. The company was named again in 1909 after it was bought by bank as 
"Aquila Anonima Italiana di L. Marsaglia", the Marsaglia part came from the name of bank owner's son Vincenzo Marsaglia, talented automobile driver.

Designed by Giulio Cesare Cappa, the cars were big four- and six-cylinder models with ioe engines of an advanced type.  There was an interruption in construction after 1908, but the company introduced new models in 1911; these featured 4192 cc six-cylinder engines and proved to be successful in many races.  Among Aquila Italiana drivers were Meo Constantini (later to join Bugatti at Molsheim, where he became first a racing driver and later the Chef d'Equipe) and Carlo Masetti (count Giulio Masetti's elder brother).

Production 
The company Aquila Italiana produced a total of approximately 1,500 copies of its cars, all models combined.

See also

 List of Italian companies

External links 
AQUILA ITALIANA mod. 25/30 HP on the National Automobile Museum of Turin website

Vintage vehicles
Defunct motor vehicle manufacturers of Italy
Vehicle manufacturing companies established in 1906
Italian companies established in 1906
Turin motor companies
Vehicle manufacturing companies disestablished in 1917
1917 disestablishments in Italy